Herbert Hoffmann (December 30, 1919 in Freienwalde in Pomerania - June 30, 2010 in Heiden, Switzerland) was a German tattoo artist and photographer.

Hoffmann as photographer 
From 1961 he produced professional photographic works in his Hamburg tattoo studio. Thus Herbert Hoffmann portrayed almost 400 tattoos within three decades with a Rolleiflex, born between 1878 and 1952.

His photographic work has been represented by Galerie Gebr. Lehmann since 2004.

"The portraits are staged with great formal care and seriousness. The result is the image of a subculture that has its roots in the gay scene and among sailors and dock workers, but which goes far beyond it."

- ELKE BUHR, MONOPOL-MAGAZIN 2018

solo exhibitions (selection) 

 2018: Es juckt schon wieder unter dem Fell, Kunst Halle Sankt Gallen, St. Gallen
 2013: Herbert Hoffmann, Künstlerverein Malkasten, Düsseldorf
 2011: Herbert Hoffmann, Galerie Susanne Zander, Köln
 2010: St. Pauli Souvenirs, Galerie Gebr. Lehmann, Berlin
 2010: Living Pictures, Ten Haaf Projects, Amsterdam
 2006: Unter die Haut – Fotografie und Tatauierkunst des Herbert Hoffmann, Museum für Völkerkunde Dresden
 2004: Glaube – Liebe – Hoffnung, Galerie Gebr. Lehmann, Dresden

group exhibitions (selection) 

 2018: Tattoo, Natural History Museum, Los Angeles
 2017: Freimütig, Galerie Gebr. Lehmann, Dresden
 2017: Tattoo und Piercing – Die Welt unter der Haut, Grassi Museum für Völkerkunde, Leipzig
 2016: Tattoo, Field Museum of Natural History, Chicago
 2016: Tattoos: Ritual. Identity. Obsession. Art., Royal Ontario Museum, Toronto
 2015: Tattoo, Museum für Kunst und Gewerbe Hamburg
 2014: Bielefeld Contemporary, Zeitgenössische Kunst aus Bielefelder Privatsammlungen, Bielefelder Kunstverein, Bielefeld
 2014: Tatoueurs, tatoués, Musée du quai Branly, Paris
 2014: Intimität, Galerie der Stadt Remscheid, Remscheid
 2013: 25, Galerie Gebr. Lehmann, Berlin
 2013: Tattoo, Gewerbemuseum Winterthur, Winterthur
 2013: the look behind, Märkisches Museum (Witten)
 2013: Hey! modern art & pop culture / Part II, Halle Saint Pierre, Paris
 2012: c´est la vie – Das ganze Leben, Deutsches Hygiene-Museum, Dresden
 2011: HotSpot Berlin – Eine Momentaufnahme, Georg Kolbe Museum, Berlin
 2010: Auf Leben und Tod – der Mensch in Malerei und Fotografie. Die Sammlung Teutloff zu Gast, Wallraf-Richartz-Museum & Fondation Corboud, Köln
 2010: Weisser Schimmel–You can observe a lot by watching, Sammlung Falckenberg, Hamburg
 2010: Nude Visions – 150 Jahre Körperbilder in der Fotografie, Museum der bildenden Künste, Leipzig
 2008: transgressive body/ reincarnated flesh, Artspace Tape Modern, Berlin
 2006: Mensch! Photographien aus Dresdner Sammlungen, Kupferstichkabinett Dresden, Staatliche Kunstsammlungen Dresden
 2006: Signs & Surfaces – Andreas Fux, Herbert Hoffmann, Ali Kepenek, Künstlerhaus Bethanien, Berlin
 2005: YES YES YES YES. Differenz und Wiederholung in Bildern der Sammlung Olbricht, Museum Morsbroich, Leverkusen

Literature

Bilderbuchmenschen. Tätowierte Passionen 1878–1952, Published by Memoria Pulp, 1st Edition 2002, German/English 
Traditionelle Tattoo-Motive, Published by Huber Verlag, Mannheim, 1st Edition 2008 (together with Dirk-Boris Rödel), 
Motivtafeln – Hamburger Tätowierungen von 1950 bis 1965, Published by Ventil Verlag, 2000,

References

External links
Official Homepage Photography Herbert Hoffmann
Official Homepage Herbert Hoffmann tattoo artist
Galerie Gebr. Lehmann
herbert-hoffmann-taetowierungen.de
tattoo-source.com

1919 births
2010 deaths
German tattoo artists
People from Stargard County
People from the Province of Pomerania